This is a list of persons considered by John Prince (1643–1723) sufficiently notable to warrant the inclusion of their biography in his work The Worthies of Devon.

The Worthies of Devon
While at Berry Pomeroy, John Prince worked on his magnum opus: a biography of his home county's many notable figures, which he probably finished in 1697. The book ran to 600 pages, with woodcuts to illustrate the 191 biographies. He struggled to find funding for it; most publishers able to handle such a large book were based in London or Oxbridge. The printer was forced to advertise for subscribers while the book languished for four years until its first publication in 1701.

It is evident that Prince was over-ambitious in his work. The alphabetical entries from A to H fill half the book, while L to Z are squeezed into the final quarter, as money problems took their toll on his inclusions. A second volume, detailing 115 entries chosen by Prince to redress the balance, was never published.

Biographies included
The following biographies appear in the 1810 edition of the book (Prince's spelling retained):

References

External links
  Full text on the Internet Archive

People